Events in the year 1847 in Mexico.

Incumbents 
President: 
 until March 21: Valentín Gómez Farías 
 March 21 – April 2: Antonio López de Santa Anna
 April 2 – May 20: Pedro María de Anaya 
 May 20 – September 15: Antonio López de Santa Anna
 September 16 – November 13: Manuel de la Peña y Peña
 starting November 13: Pedro María de Anaya

Governors
 Aguascalientes: Felipe Cosio
 Chiapas: Jerónimo Cardona
 Chihuahua: 
 Coahuila: José María de Aguirre González/N/A
 Durango:  
 Guanajuato: 
 Guerrero: 
 Jalisco: Joaquín Angulo/Sabás Sánchez Hidalgo
 State of Mexico:  
 Michoacán: 
 Nuevo León: José María Parás
 Oaxaca: 
 Puebla: 
 Querétaro: Francisco Berdusco/Francisco de Paula Mesa
 San Luis Potosí: 
 Sinaloa: 
 Sonora: 
 Tabasco: 
 Tamaulipas: Francisco Vital Fernandez	 
 Veracruz: Manuel Gutiérrez Zamora/José de Emparán/Manuel Gutiérrez Zamora
 Yucatán: 
 Zacatecas:

Events 
 January 13 – The Treaty of Cahuenga ends the fighting in the Mexican–American War in California.
 February 22 – Mexican–American War – The Battle of Buena Vista: 5,000 American troops under General Zachary Taylor use their superiority in artillery to drive off 15,000 Mexican troops under Antonio López de Santa Anna, defeating the Mexicans the next day.
 March 9 – Mexican–American War: United States forces under General Winfield Scott invade Mexico near Veracruz.
 March 29 – Mexican–American War: United States forces led by General Winfield Scott take Veracruz after a siege.
 April 18-Battle of Cerro Gordo August 12 – Mexican–American War: U.S. troops of General Winfield Scott begin to advance along the aqueduct around Lake Chalco and Lake Xochimilco in Mexico
 August 20 – Mexican–American War: US troops defeat Mexican troops in Valencia de Fuentes, Mexico
 September 8- Battle of Molino Del Rey

 
Years of the 19th century in Mexico
Mexico
Mexico
1840s in Mexico